Pearly Tan Koong Le  (born 14 March 2000) is a Malaysian badminton player who entered the national team in 2013. She was the gold medalists in the women's doubles and mixed team event at the 2022 Commonwealth Games. In the junior event, she won the girls' doubles silver at the 2018 Asian and World Junior Championships.

Career 
In 2021, Tan with her partner Thinaah Muralitharan, clinched their first BWF World Tour title in the Swiss Open.

In 2022, Tan and Muralitharan claimed the French Open title, becomes the first ever Malaysian women's doubles to achieve this feat.

Personal life
Tan was born in Alor Setar, Kedah to Tan Chai Ling and badminton coach Tan Seng Hoe. Her father runs the Alor Setar Racquet Club (ASRC), which was the club of national shuttlers Lee Zii Jia and Jacky Kok.

Achievements

Commonwealth Games 

Women's doubles

World Junior Championships 
Girls' doubles

Asian Junior Championships 
Girls' doubles

BWF World Tour (2 titles) 
The BWF World Tour, which was announced on 19 March 2017 and implemented in 2018, is a series of elite badminton tournaments sanctioned by the Badminton World Federation (BWF). The BWF World Tours are divided into levels of World Tour Finals, Super 1000, Super 750, Super 500, Super 300, and the BWF Tour Super 100.

Women's doubles

BWF International Challenge/Series (3 titles, 3 runners-up) 
Women's doubles

Mixed doubles

  BWF International Challenge tournament
  BWF International Series tournament

Awards and recognition

Order 
  :
 Companion of the Ahli Cemerlang Semangat Jerai Kedah (ASK) (2022)

References

External links 
 

Living people
2000 births
People from Kedah
Malaysian female badminton players
Malaysian sportspeople of Chinese descent
Badminton players at the 2022 Commonwealth Games
Commonwealth Games gold medallists for Malaysia
Commonwealth Games medallists in badminton
21st-century Malaysian women
Medallists at the 2022 Commonwealth Games